Arabia Felix (literally: Fertile/Happy Arabia; also Ancient Greek: Εὐδαίμων Ἀραβία, Eudaemon Arabia) was the Latin name previously used by geographers to describe South Arabia,<ref>New Geographical Dictionary (Springfield, Mass., 1972), p. 63.</ref> or what is now Yemen.

Etymology

The term Arabia Felix (Latin: “Happy, or Flourishing, Arabia”) was the Roman translation of the earlier Greek Hellenistic term Arabia Eudaimon, attributed to Eratosthenes of Cyrene.Roller, Duane W. (2010) Eratosthenes’ Geography. Fragments Collected and Translated, with Commentary and Additional Material. Princeton University Press. Felix has the simultaneous meaning of "fecund, fertile" and "happy, fortunate, blessed." Arabia Felix was one of three regions into which the Romans divided the Arabian peninsula: Arabia Deserta, Arabia Felix, and Arabia Petraea. The Greeks and the Romans called Yemen Arabia Felix.
The French term L'Arabie Heureuse ("Happy Arabia") comes from a poor translation from Latin. This area being the best irrigated of the peninsula, it was called "Fertile Arabia". One of the earliest such maps, dated 1654, was produced by the French cartographer Nicolas Sanson.

History
The southwestern corner of the peninsula experienced more rainfall in ancient times and was thus much greener than the rest of the peninsula, enjoying more productive fields. The high peaks and slopes are capable of supporting significant vegetation and river beds called wadis help make other soil fertile. In 26 BC, Aelius Gallus under Augustus' order led a military expedition to Arabia, but after some beginning successes he was obliged by the unhealthy climate and epidemic to desist in the conquest of the area.

Part of what led to Arabia Felix's wealth and importance to the ancient world was its near monopoly of the trade in cinnamon and spices, both its native products and imports from India and the Horn of Africa. Strabo says that Arabia Felix was composed of five kingdoms, one each of warriors, farmers, "those who engage in the mechanical arts; another, the myrrh-bearing country, and another the frankincense-bearing country, although the same countries produce cassia, cinnamon, and nard."

In the 1st century BC, the Arabian city of Eudaemon (usually identified with the port of Aden), in Arabia Felix, was a transshipping port in the Red Sea trade. It was described in the Periplus of the Erythraean Sea (probably 1st century AD) as if it had fallen on hard times. Of the auspiciously named port we read in the periplus that Eudaemon Arabia was once a full-fledged city, when vessels from India did not go to Egypt and those of Egypt did not dare sail to places further on, but came only this far.New developments in trade during the 1st century AD led to traders avoiding the middlemen of Eudaemon and making the dangerous direct crossing of the Arabian Sea to the coast of India.Arabia Felix'' is the title of the 1962 book by Danish novelist Thorkild Hansen, detailing a disastrous scientific expedition to the area led by Carsten Niebuhr lasting from 1761 to 1767. The veracity of certain aspects of the account have, however, been called into question.

See also
 Australia Felix

References

External links
Arabia Felix
Nabataean Travel: trade on the Red Sea

Arabian Peninsula
Ancient history of Yemen
Ancient cities of the Middle East
Latin words and phrases
Historical regions
Historical regions in Saudi Arabia
South Arabia
Arabia
Ancient Greek geography of Arabia